Broom Hill is an unincorporated community in Carr Township, Clark County, Indiana.

History
Broom Hill was founded in 1851 by Thomas Littell who started a business of manufacturing brooms. A post office was established at Broom Hill in 1855, and remained in operation until it was discontinued in 1857.

Geography

References

Unincorporated communities in Clark County, Indiana
Unincorporated communities in Indiana
Louisville metropolitan area
1851 establishments in Indiana